The Shiziyang Tunnel is a high-speed railway tunnel under Shiziyang, the northern part of the Pearl River estuary in China.

Route
The 10.8 km long tunnel is part of a -long high-speed line from Guangzhou to Shenzhen and Hong Kong. It is designed for speeds of up to 350 km/h (usually 250 km/h in operation) - the fastest underwater tunnel in the world. as well as being China's longest underwater tunnel. This allows rail journeys between Guangzhou and Hong Kong to take only 40 minutes – much faster than the previous 2-hour journey. The Guangzhou-Shenzhen-Hong Kong express rail link is part of a broader expansion of high-speed rail in China; journeys from Beijing to Hong Kong will take only 8 hours.

Construction
Construction began in November 2007, with a budget of CNY2.4 billion; the tunnel was completed in 2011, and passenger services began on 26 December 2011. Unusually, the tunnel boring machines were designed to be dismantled inside the tunnel.

References

Railway tunnels in China
High-speed rail in China
Tunnels completed in 2011